The following bibliography of Roberto Bolaño provides a chronological list of the published works of Chilean writer Roberto Bolaño (1953–2003). It includes his fiction (novels, short stories, poems) and non-fiction (essays, speeches, interviews), both published during his lifetime and posthumously.

Books
Note: Titles appearing in brackets have not yet been translated into English and are only literal indications of the original Spanish titles.

Novels

Short story collections

Poetry collections

Other books

Pieces

Short stories
Note: Four essays collected within short-story books are listed here tagged with "[essay]".

Poems

Interviews with Bolaño

Works about Bolaño

Articles

Books

References

Bibliographies by writer
Bibliographies of Chilean writers
Poetry bibliographies